The Scottish Football League (SFL) was a league featuring professional and semi-professional football clubs, mostly from Scotland. From its foundation in 1890 until the breakaway Scottish Premier League (SPL) was formed in 1998, the SFL represented the top level of football in Scotland. After 1998, the SFL represented levels 2 to 4 of the Scottish football league system. In June 2013, the SFL merged with the SPL to form the Scottish Professional Football League. The SFL was played out in a wide variety of stadiums, ranging from the stadiums of Glasgow giants Celtic and Rangers to the intimate surroundings of Cliftonhill and Dumbarton Football Stadium, with capacities of just over 2000.

Founding Members, 1890–1891
Stadiums marked in bold are the stadiums used during the inaugural season of the Scottish Football League.

New members, 1891–1900

New members, 1901–1910

New members, 1911–1920

New members, 1921–1930

New members, 1931–2010

See also
List of football stadiums in Scotland
List of Scottish Premier League stadiums
List of Scottish Professional Football League stadiums
Scottish football attendance records
 Scottish stadium moves

References 
http://www.scottishfootballleague.com
http://www.footballgroundguide.com/scotland
http://www.myfootygrounds.co.uk/ScottishGrounds.asp
https://web.archive.org/web/20091222081409/http://scottish-football-historical-archive.com/
http://www.britainfromabove.org.uk Aerial views of many Scottish stadiums
http://www.oldmapsonline.org Includes outlines of most Scottish stadiums on historical maps
Crampsey, Robert A., The First 100 Years (The Official Centenary History of the Scottish Football League)

External links 
 Scottish Football stadium facts, figures, photos, and more at Scottish Football Ground Guide
 Scottish stadium information at myfootygrounds.co.uk

 
Scottish Football League

cs:Seznam fotbalových stadionů ve Skotsku
es:Anexo:Estadios de fútbol de Escocia
hu:Skót labdarúgó-stadionok listája
no:Fotballstadioner i Skottland
ru:Список футбольных стадионов Шотландии